Andrew Sesinyi (born September 7, 1952) is the Motswana author of Love on the Rocks (1981). He also worked in the media administration of Botswana. Sesinyi is Botswana's first English novelist.

His works convey the images of urban Botswana in the 1980s. Sesinyi has been profiled by Mmegi, Botswana's only independent newspaper published daily. Mmegi published its interview under a special ''Icons of Botswana" feature.

References

Sources

External links
Thuto.org
Andrew Sesinyi's personal blog

1952 births
Living people
Botswana male writers
Botswana novelists
Male novelists
21st-century novelists
21st-century male writers